CPWA may refer to:
  Certified Private Wealth Advisor
 Church of the Province of West Africa
 Certified Professional in Web Accessibility
 College Place, Washington
  A variant of the Volkswagen EA211 engine